Umaga may refer to: 
Jack Umaga (b. 1984), New Zealand-born Romanian rugby union player
Mike Umaga (b. 1966), New Zealand-born Samoan rugby union player
Tana Umaga (b. 1973), New Zealand rugby union player
Umaga (wrestler) (1973–2009), Samoan-American wrestler
Peter Umaga-Jensen (b. 1997), New Zealand rugby union player

Parish of Umaga, a low level cadastral unit in the Torres Strait Islands